USRC Crawford may refer to more than one ship of the United States Revenue-Marine:

, a revenue cutter in commission from 1830 to 1835
, a revenue cutter in commission from 1833 to 1847, renamed USRC Crawford in April 1839